Laininthou Sanamahee (Meetei: ꯂꯥꯏꯅꯤꯡꯊꯧ ꯁꯥꯅꯥꯃꯍꯤ) is the Supreme Guardian God of mankind and the supreme deity of the household in Meetei religion and mythology. He originated from the ancient kingdom of Kangleipak (Manipur). He is regarded as the most popular and significant divinity of Sanamahism. He is the brother of Pakhangba and Nongshaba. He is the eldest son of Creator God Saalailel Sitapa and Leimalel Sitapee, the protector of the Universe in Meetei mythology and philosophy and Mother Earth goddess Leimarel Sidabi.

Etymology 
The term Lainingthou is derived from Meetei language which means "King of Gods" and the term Sanamahi is  combination of "Sanna" which means spreading and "Eemahi" which means "blood that originates living", literally means "spreading everywhere (like liquid)".

Mythology 

When Sanamahi was ordered to cross the globe by his father, he at once proceeded. However, his younger brother Pakhangba as per the instruction of his mother Leimarel Sidabi, went around his father Atingkok Maru Sidaba, who is equivalent to the globe.

As per the declaration that among the two brothers, the first to succeed in traveling across the globe, would be offered his father's throne of the Universe. That's how Pakhangba got the throne. However, in order to compensate Sanamahi, Atingkok Maru Sidaba offered him to be the king of every household of Mankind in the universe.

Divine names

There are one thousand divine names of the God Lainingthou Sanamahi.

Religious sites 
The sacred places of Lainingthou Sanamahi include Sanamahi Temple, Kangla Palace, and Sanamahi Kiyong Temple.

Texts 
Ancient texts that discuss him include:
 Sanamahi Laihui
 Karthong Lamlen
Wakoklon Heelel Thilen Salai Amailon Pukok Puya (written in 1400 BC) 
 Hijan-Hirao
 Besides the above-mentioned sacred books, there are several sacred books or Puya (Meitei texts) discovered from various hidings.

Festivals

The religious festivals associated with Lord Sanamahi are:
 Sanamahi Ahong Khong Chingba
 Mera Hou Chongba
 Lai Haraoba
 Sajibu Cheiraoba

See also 
 Lists of creatures in Meitei folklore
 Lists of deities in Sanamahism
 Sanamahi creation myth

References 

 
Meitei deities
Names of God in Sanamahism
Ningthou